Camille Constance Anderson (born March 12, 1978) is an American actress, model, and television host. Camille graduated from the University of Texas at Austin with a degree in broadcast journalism and she also held the title of Miss Austin USA.

Anderson was born in Dallas, Texas. She has appeared in a number of TV shows, movies, commercials and magazine covers, including Stuff, Fitness Rx, and FHM Australia's "Hottest 100 Women in the World." She currently resides in Los Angeles, where she is a TV host and luxury real estate specialist.

Filmography
Slightly Single in LA (2013)
Frat Party (2009)
The John Kerwin Show (2008)
Las Vegas (2005–2007)
G-Phoria 2005 (2005)
Wedding Crashers (2005)
The John Henson Project (2004)
Average Joe: Adam Returns (2004)
The Sports List (2004)
WWE RAW (2004)
The Screensavers (2004)
Intolerable Cruelty (2003)
Regular Joe (2003)
Trash to Cash with John DiResta (2003)
Sketch Pad 2 (2003)
Sketch Pad (2003)
Pauly Shore Is Dead (2003)
Get Out (2003-2009)
The Man Show (2002)
Psychotic (2002)
Dharma & Greg (2001)
Rock Star (2001)
Wild On... (2001)
Diagnosis Murder (2001)
Oblivious (2001)
Arrest & Trial (2000)

References

External links

1978 births
Living people
Actresses from Dallas
Moody College of Communication alumni
American film actresses
WWE Diva Search contestants
21st-century American actresses